Entomostracites is a scientific name for several trilobites, now assigned to various other genera.
 E. bucephalus = Paradoxides paradoxissimus
 E. crassicauda = Illaenus crassicauda
 E. expansus = Asaphus expansus
 E. gibbosus = Olenus gibbosus 
 E. granulatus = Nankinolithus granulatus
 E. laciniatus = Lichas laciniatus
 E. laticauda = Eobronteus laticauda
 E. paradoxissimus = Paradoxides paradoxissimus 
 E. pisiformis = Agnostus pisiformis
 E. punctatus = Encrinurus punctatus
 E. scarabaeoides = Peltura scarabaeoides
 E. spinulosus = Parabolina spinulosa

References 

Disused trilobite generic names